Cirque Peak may refer to:
 Cirque Peak (Alberta) — in Banff National Park, Alberta, Canada
 Cirque Peak (Antarctica)
 Cirque Peak (British Columbia)
 Cirque Peak (California)  — in the Sierra Nevada, in Inyo National Forest straddling the Golden Trout and John Muir Wildernesses border, California, U.S.